Ritchie is an unincorporated community in Ohio Township, Spencer County, in the U.S. state of Indiana.

History
Ritchie was named for R. Ritchie, the original owner of the town site.

Geography

References

Unincorporated communities in Spencer County, Indiana
Unincorporated communities in Indiana